Nima-odsor (1894–1936) was an Inner Mongolian politician of the Republic of China, shot to death by assassins on an intercity bus ride.

Names
His Mongolian name would be written in the Mongolian Cyrillic alphabet as Ням-осор (Nyam-osor). Newspaper reports transcribed these Chinese characters back into English with a variety of unusual spellings, including Ni-Ma-O-Teh-Su-Erh and Ne-Mo-Ngoh-Ta-U-Erh. He also used the Chinese name Ni Kuan-chou.

Career
Nima-odsor was a member of the Central Committee of the Kuomintang and of the Mongol Local Autonomy Political Affairs Committee. He was a close associate of Ünenbayan and Jodbajab. In January 1936, Nima-odsor, Ünenbayan, Serengdongrub, and Demchugdongrub went to Zhangbei for a meeting with Jodbajab. In that meeting, they discussed Jodbajab's deployment of cavalry police in six counties in northern Chahar Province (demilitarised by the Chin–Doihara Agreement in the wake of the North Chahar Incident) in response to Manchukuo troops' occupation of the area under Li Shouxin the previous month.

After the meeting ended, on 23 January Nima-odsor took a bus to return to Kalgan; gunmen in civilian clothes stopped the bus, boarded it, identified Nima-odsor, shot him at point blank range, and then fled without harming any other passengers. The Japanese denied any connection and claimed it had been done by Chinese agents. Newspaper reports at the time suggested Nima-odsor thought that Jodbajab had exceeded his authority and that there might be some conflict between the two. Later scholarly sources conclude that the assassination was a Japanese plot in response to Nima-odsor's Mongol nationalism and opposition to Japanese expansionism. In the aftermath, Demchugdongrub, who had been working with the Japanese, stated that he knew in advance of a (failed) Japanese plot to assassinate Ünenbayan, but the assassination of Nima-odsor came as a complete surprise to him, because he thought the latter would be protected by Jodbajab.

The most notable consequence of Nima-odsor's assassination was that his friend Jodbajab was intimidated into further cooperation with the Japanese, and joined Demchugdongrub's Mongol Military Government soon after.

References

Bibliography

1894 births
1936 deaths
Assassinated Chinese politicians
Republic of China politicians from Inner Mongolia
Political office-holders in Inner Mongolia
Members of the Kuomintang